The Last Dog in Rwanda is a Swedish short narrative film from 2006 directed and written by Jens Assur. It was Assur's debut both as a writer and a director.

Festivals and awards
Tribeca Film Festival, USABest Short Narrative2007

External links

Footnotes

Swedish short films
2006 short films
2006 films
2000s Swedish-language films
2000s English-language films
2000s Swedish films
2006 multilingual films
Swedish multilingual films